J. W. O. Adjemang was a Ghanaian civil servant, politician and, member of the National Liberation Council. He was the Assistant Commissioner of the Ghana Police Service and the Commissioner for the Upper Region (now divided into the Upper East Region and the Upper West Region) from 1966 to 1967. He was succeeded by Imoru Lafia.

References 
 

20th-century births 
Year of birth missing
Possibly living people
Ghanaian civil servants
Ghanaian police officers